Robert Harpur (January 25, 1731 – April 15, 1825) was an Irish-American teacher, politician, pioneer, and landowner. He participated in surveying lands within the Central Military Tract in New York State and is credited with giving classical (Latin and Greek) place names to numerous locations in central New York. He settled in the Binghamton, New York area, where Harpur College is named for him.

Life
Harpur was born in Ballybay, County Monaghan, Ireland. He was a graduate of the University of Glasgow and taught in Ireland for 7 years before coming to the Colony of New York in 1760. Three days after his arrival in 1761 he was installed as professor of mathematics at King's College, renamed Columbia College after U.S. independence (today Columbia University). One of his prized pupils was Alexander Hamilton while he studied there in 1774. During his tenure, he was hired by the university to catalog the collections of the Columbia library, making him the first librarian of the university.

Harpur served in various capacities in the New York government during the American Revolution.  He was a member of the New York State Assembly from 1777 to 1784. He was Deputy Secretary of State under John Morin Scott and Lewis Allaire Scott from 1778 to 1795.  In the spring of 1795, after the American Revolutionary War, Robert Harpur, with his 2nd wife Myra and family, moved west along the upper Susquehanna River. He settled near Belden Brook on his Warren Patent, which is near present-day Harpursville, NY.

Legacy
Harpursville, New York in eastern Broome County, New York was named after him.  Additionally, Harpur College, the arts and sciences component, and the oldest part, of present-day Binghamton University, was also named for him.

Classical names used in New York

While Harpur worked as a clerk in the office of the New York State Surveyor General, and Secretary of the Land Board, he assigned numerous classical tradition names to locations in the Central New York Military Tract, today in Cayuga County, Cortland County, Oneida County, Onondaga County, and Seneca County.

An earlier theory was that Surveyor General Simeon De Witt assigned these classical names.

Archival material
The New York State Library, in Albany, New York, holds the following materials of Harpur, according to its online catalog: "This collection contains material created by Harpur and material collected about him. Among Harpur's papers are his personal account books, 1768-1814, which include house expenses and tuition accounts for students he tutored; and a photostat of a land grant to Harpur for lands in Kingsbury and Queensbury townships. Among the items collected about Harpur are several biographies, postcards of the Senate House in Kingston, N.Y. and Clinton's mansion, and a photostat of a 1790 print of Columbia College, where Harpur taught."

See also 
Colesville, New York

References

External links 
  Early history of Colesville, NY

1731 births
1825 deaths
Columbia University faculty
Columbia University librarians
Members of the New York State Assembly
Politicians from Binghamton, New York
History of Broome County, New York
Politicians from County Monaghan
Irish emigrants to the United States (before 1923)
Central New York
People from Colesville, New York
Binghamton University
Alumni of the University of Glasgow